Charles Thomas Jackson (June 21, 1805 – August 28, 1880) was an American physician and scientist who was active in medicine, chemistry, mineralogy, and geology.

Life and work 

Born at Plymouth, Massachusetts, of a prominent New England family, he was a brother-in-law of Ralph Waldo Emerson and a graduate of the Harvard Medical School in 1829, where he won the Boylston prize for his dissertation. While at Harvard he made a geological exploration of Nova Scotia with his friend Francis Alger of Boston, which helped to increasingly turn his interests toward geology. In 1829, he traveled to Europe where he studied both medicine and geology for several years and made the acquaintance of prominent European scientists and physicians.

Upon returning to the United States he played an active role in the new state geological survey movement, serving successively between 1836 and 1844 as the state geologist of Maine, Rhode Island, and New Hampshire. In 1844–45, he was an on-site mining consultant to the Lake Superior Copper Company, one of the first companies to attempt mining the native copper deposits of Michigan's Keweenaw Peninsula on Lake Superior.

In 1847, Jackson was appointed United States Geologist for the Lake Superior land district, which was about to become one of the major copper-producing regions of the world.  His leadership of that survey proved to be a disaster, and he was dismissed from his position and the completion of the survey was turned over to his assistants John Wells Foster and Josiah Dwight Whitney.

Jackson is particularly remembered for his involvement in a series of often bitter priority conflicts that left their marks on the scientific and social scenes of his day. They followed a standard pattern: a discovery would be announced by someone, Jackson would then claim prior discovery, and a controversy would ensue. Among them were conflicts over the discovery of guncotton (Christian Friedrich Schönbein), the telegraph (Samuel F. B. Morse), the digestive action of the stomach (William Beaumont), and the anesthetic effects of ether (William T. G. Morton).

Jackson also made a similar priority claim (1849) for the discovery that the unusual native copper deposits of Lake Superior, contrary to all previous geological expectations, could be successfully mined, although at that time it was universally acknowledged that credit for that discovery belonged to the recently deceased Douglass Houghton, Michigan's first state geologist.  In this case, however, the historical evidence does indicate that Jackson's claim for himself was valid, and his mineralogical insights were significantly in advance of those of his contemporaries, including Houghton.

It is widely believed and reported that in 1873, Jackson was afflicted with mental illness, either through a seizure, or having a manic episode upon seeing Morton's tombstone, and spent the remainder of his life in the McLean Asylum, Somerville, Massachusetts, where he died on August 28, 1880.  In fact, Jackson suffered a left brain stroke that affected his language area, and while he never regained his speech, he was cooperative and did not exhibit "inappropriate behavior of insanity".  By unanimous vote of the McLean Asylum Trustees, Jackson was hosted as a guest at the Asylum at no charge for the entire duration of his stay in part because of his earlier helpful work in collaboration with McLean Superintendent Dr. Luther Bell showing beneficial effects of ether in McLean Asylum patients (Wolfe & Patterson, 2007, pages 18–19), as described in Jackson's Manual of Etherization (1861). He is buried at Mount Auburn Cemetery in Cambridge, Massachusetts, as is one of his rivals, Dr. William T. G. Morton.

Legacy 
In 2021, residents of the town of Jackson, New Hampshire, voted to replace President Andrew Jackson with Charles Thomas Jackson as the namesake of the town.

Selected writings

Further reading 

 
 
 
 
 
 "Charles Thomas Jackson." Dictionary of American Biography Base Set. American Council of Learned Societies, 1928–1936.
 "Charles Thomas Jackson." Webster's American Biographies. G. & C. Merriam 1975.

References

External links 

 - Contains an extensive bibliography of Jackson's writings
Obituary, Scientific American, "Dr. Charles Thomas Jackson", 2 October 1880, p. 218

1805 births
1880 deaths
American geologists
19th-century American physicians
Harvard Medical School alumni
People from Plymouth, Massachusetts
Physicians from Massachusetts
McLean Hospital patients
Recipients of the Order of Saints Maurice and Lazarus